Kʼawiil, in the Post-Classic codices corresponding to God K, is a Maya deity identified with lightning, serpents, fertility and maize. He is characterized by a zoomorphic head, with large eyes, long, upturned snout and attenuated serpent foot. A torch, stone celt, or cigar, normally emitting smoke, comes out of his forehead, while a serpent leg represents a lightning bolt. In this way, Kʼawiil personifies the lightning axe both of the rain deity and of the king as depicted on his stelae.

Names
From the correspondence between Landa's description of the New Year rituals and the depiction of these rituals in the Dresden Codex, it can be inferred that in 16th-century Yucatán, Kʼawiil was called Bolon Dzacab 'Innumerable (bolon 'nine, innumerable') maternal generations', perhaps a metaphor for fertility. God K's name in the Classic period may have been the same, or similar, since the numeral 'nine' is repeatedly found included in the deity's logogram.

However, based on epigraphical considerations, the Classical god K is now most often referred to as Kʼawiil. Hieroglyphically, the head of god K can substitute for the syllable kʼa in kʼawiil, a word possibly meaning 'powerful one', and attested as a generic deity title in Yucatec documents. This substitution has given rise to the idea that, inversely, the title kʼawiil as a whole should be considered a name specifically referring to god K.

Narratives and scenes

Lightning plays a crucial role in tales dealing with the creation of the world and its preparation for the advent of mankind. In the cosmogony of the Popol Vuh, three Lightning deities identified with the 'Heart of the Sky' (among whom Huraqan 'One-Leg') create the earth out of the primordial sea, and people it with animals. Bolon Dzacab plays an important, if not very clear role in the cosmogonical myth related in the Book of Chilam Balam of Chumayel, where he is identified with wrapped-up seeds. The rain gods or their lightning once opened up the Maize Mountain, making the maize seeds available to mankind. 

Kʼawiil also figures in an enigmatic Classic scene known only from ceramics (see fig.2), showing an aged ancestor or deity emerging from the serpentine foot of the lightning god, apparently to mate with a nude young woman of decidedly aristocratic allure entwined by the serpent. Not impossibly, the meaning of the scene is ritual, rather than mythological. 

Perhaps related to the latter scene, stucco reliefs on the pillars of the Temple of the Inscriptions at Palenque depict a king (and perhaps also a queen) holding a baby with a lightning celt in the forehead and a serpentine leg, or, the infant lightning god (unen q'awiil) that is also one of Palenque's three patron deities (GII).

Functions
The illustrated katun cycle of the Paris Codex suggests that the presentation of the head of Kʼawiil – perhaps holding the promise of 'Innumerable Generations' – was part of the king's ritual inauguration and accession to the throne. Kʼawiil not only embodied the king's war-like lightning power, but also his power to bring agricultural prosperity to his subjects: The Lightning deity was a god of agricultural abundance, and of the maize and cacao seeds in particular. Therefore, he is often depicted with a sack of grains, sometimes accompanied by the expression hun yax(al) hun kʼan(al) 'abundance'.

See also
List of Maya gods and supernatural beings
Jasaw Chan Kʼawiil I
Maya religion

References

Bibliography

Maya mythology and religion
Maya deities